Georges A. Cronier was a French sailor who competed in the 1900 Summer Olympics in Paris, France. Cronier took the 4th place in the 10 to 20 ton.

References

External links

 

French male sailors (sport)
Sailors at the 1900 Summer Olympics – 10 to 20 ton
Olympic sailors of France
Year of birth missing
Year of death missing
Place of birth missing
Place of death missing
20th-century French people